Nad Al Sheba Racecourse was Thoroughbred horse racing facility in Dubai, United Arab Emirates opened in 1986. It had a 2,200 m left-handed dirt race track and a left-handed turf course of the same distance. It operated from November through March and featured the Dubai International Racing Carnival and its Dubai World Cup Night.

Nad Al Sheba Racecourse was demolished in 2009 following hosting the Dubai World Cup race, being replaced by Meydan Racecourse.

History
Horse racing began in Dubai as early as 1981, and in 1986 Nad Al Sheba Racecourse was formally opened.  The course also featured a golf course in the centre.

In 1992, Sheikh Mohammed bin Rashid Al Maktoum formed the Dubai Racing Club to increase the popularity of the sport in the city, and later in 1993 the Dubai Racing Club hosted the inaugural Dubai International Jockeys Challenge at Nad Al Sheba.  In 1996, the Dubai World Cup was created with the horses competing for a prize of $4million.  This was a significant prize purse for the era.  The first Dubai World Cup was won by Cigar.  Today the race day is worth a total prize purse in excess of $30million.

In 2000, the Godolphin owned Dubai Millennium won the world cup race with a record time of 1.59.50.  In 2001, the Millennium Grandstand was opened.
In 2007, it was announced that Meydan Racecourse would replace Nad Al Sheba.  For the following two years, the new grandstands were visible under construction.  Following the 2009 Dubai World Cup, Nad Al Sheba racecourse was demolished and now sits as part of the Meydan Racecourse facility.

The last winner at Nad Al Sheba was Well Armed.

Group 1 Races

Records
At the time of closure, the following records were held:

Top Jockey - Frankie Dettori (132 wins)
Top Trainer - Saeed Bin Suroor (213 wins)
Top Owner - Godolphin (142 wins)

Non Racing Events
Nad Al Sheba featured a golf club, which was designed in 1993 by Karl Litten.  It was an 18 hole links style course, 6503 yards in length and had a par of 71.  The copurse was closed in May 2007 to make way for the Meydan Racecourse development.  At the time it had around 1200 members.

Two major concerts took place at Nad Al Sheba.  On February 14, 2004 Whitney Houston performed as part of her Prior to Soul Divas Tour. In April 2006, Robbie Williams performed a concert at Nad Al Sheba as part of his Close Encounters World Tour.

References

 
Horse racing venues in the United Arab Emirates
Sports venues completed in 1986
2009 disestablishments in the United Arab Emirates
1986 establishments in the United Arab Emirates